Zhongshan Torch Hi-tech Industrial Development Zone also known as Zhongshangang Subdistrict or Zhangjiabian Subdistrict, is a national-level hi-tech industrial development zone in Zhongshan, Guangdong, China. Formerly the three subdistricts: THIDZ, Zhongshangang and Zhangjiabian were three separate subdistricts until they were merged in January 1993. Its population is about 238,500 in 2006.

It was jointly established by the Ministry of Science and Technology, Guangdong Provincial Government and Zhongshan Municipal Government in 1990. Several national-level enterprises have established industrial bases in the zone.

References

External links
Zhongshan Torch Hi-tech Industrial Development Zone

1990 establishments in China
Zhongshan
Populated places established in 1990
Township-level divisions of Guangdong
Subdistricts of the People's Republic of China